Bis(trifluoromethyl) disulfide (TFD) is a fluorinated organosulfur compound that was used as a fumigant. It is also an intermediate in the synthesis of triflic acid. It is a volatile liquid that is extremely toxic by inhalation.

Synthesis
TFD can be produced by reaction of perchloromethyl mercaptan or thiophosgene with sodium fluoride.

Toxicity
TFD is extremely toxic by inhalation. TFD is a powerful pulmonary agent that can cause severe pulmonary edema. TFD is about half as toxic as perfluoroisobutene.

See also
Dimethyl(trifluoromethylthio)arsine
Perchloromethyl mercaptan
Thiophosgene
Perfluoroisobutene
Phosgene

Reference

Organic disulfides
Trifluoromethylthio compounds
Pulmonary agents
Fumigants